"Falling Down" is a song by British DJ and record producer Sub Focus, featuring vocals from Boston-born and London-raised singer Kenzie May. Originally previewed through Douwma' SoundCloud page on 14 December 2011, it was released as a free digital download on 1 January 2012 through RAM Records and Mercury Records. The song became the first single of Sub Focus' second studio album Torus. On 15 May 2012, the single was re-released as an EP through Owsla alongside remixes from Nick Thayer, xKore and Sub Focus himself. The VIP also features on the deluxe edition of Torus.

Background and release
The synth hook on "Falling Down" was originally intended for the Chase & Status and Takura collaboration "Flashing Lights" but didn't fit the song so was re-used as a starting point for the new song. While the track was being finished, Skrillex coincidentally visited the studios to meet Caspa and Douwma showed him the track. Skrillex enjoyed it and decided to release it on Owsla.

Track listing

Credits and personnel
 Vocals, writer – Kenzie May
 Producer, programming – Nick Douwma
 Writer – Thomas "Tom Cane" Havelock
 Label – RAM Records, Mercury Records, Owsla

Release history

References

2011 singles
Sub Focus songs
Mercury Records singles
RAM Records singles
Songs written by Tom Cane
Songs written by Sub Focus